The 2014–2015 Bryant Bulldogs men's basketball team represented Bryant University during the 2014–15 NCAA Division I men's basketball season. The team was led by seventh year head coach Tim O'Shea and played their home games at the Chace Athletic Center. They were members of the Northeast Conference. They finished the season 16–15, 12–6 in NEC play to finish in a tie for second place. They advanced to the semifinals of the NEC tournament where they lost to Robert Morris.

Roster

Schedule

|-
!colspan=9 style="background:#000000; color:#CCCC99;"| Regular season

|-
!colspan=9 style="background:#000000; color:#CCCC99;"| NEC tournament

References

Bryant Bulldogs men's basketball seasons
Bryant
Bryant
Bryant